Nawab Nabi Bux Khan Bhutto (2 January 1887 – 6 December 1965) was the Pakistani lawyer and political leader who was the member of legislative assembly before Partition of India from unknown date to 14 August 1947. He was also the brother of Shah Nawaz Bhutto, who later became father of Zulfikar Ali Bhutto. He is also famous for being father of Mumtaz Bhutto and grandfather of Ameer Bux Bhutto.

Relations 
Bhutto was born on 2 January 1887 in Mumbai to Ghulam Murtaza Bhutto. He was married and he had a son Mumtaz Bhutto (1933–2021). Mumtaz Bhutto has also married and has a son Ameer Bux Bhutto. He was the eldest brother of Shah Nawaz Bhutto, who later became the father of Zulfiqar Ali Bhutto.

References

External links 
 Awam Ki Adalat – 3 July 2011 | PKPolitics - Pakistan Politics
 1988 Parliamentary elections - Business Recorder
 Sindh National Front: Home
 Profile, Biography - Show all posts
 Mumtaz Bhutto's rebuttal to President Asif Zardari

1887 births
1965 deaths
Pakistani barristers
Sindhi people
Nabi Bux